Sidimo, alternatively Siidamo, is a town in the southwestern Gedo region of Somalia.

References
Sidimo

Populated places in Gedo